Arthur Wesley Parsons (born September 6, 1992) is an American professional baseball pitcher who is currently a free agent. He has played in Major League Baseball (MLB) for the Atlanta Braves and the Colorado Rockies and in the Korea Baseball Organization for the NC Dinos.

Career
After graduating from Clarksville High School in Clarksville, Tennessee, Parsons enrolled at Jackson State Community College. In 13 games started as a freshman, he had a 7–3 win–loss record with a 4.31 earned run average (ERA), striking out 60 in  innings pitched. After his freshman year, he played for the Thunder Bay Bordercats in the Northwoods League, a summer wooden bat league for top college prospects. After making the league's All-Star game, Parsons signed with the Atlanta Braves as an undrafted free agent in 2013.

Atlanta Braves
After signing, Parsons was assigned to the Rome Braves where he was 7–7 with a 2.63 ERA in 19 starts. In 2014 he pitched for the Lynchburg Hillcats, posting a 4–7 record and a 5.00 ERA in 23 starts. Parsons pitched in only five games in 2015 due to injury. He spent the majority of 2016 with the Carolina Mudcats where he was 0–2 with a 3.86 ERA in 16 games (seven starts), along with pitching one game for the Mississippi Braves. In 2017, Parsons pitched in 26 games (ten starts) for Mississippi where he compiled a 3–3 record and 2.71 ERA, and  innings for the Gwinnett Braves where he posted an 8.64 ERA. He began 2018 with Mississippi and was promoted to the Gwinnett Stripers in May after pitching to a 1–2 record and a 1.23 ERA over eight games (seven starts) for Mississippi.

Parsons was called up to the major leagues by Atlanta on June 27, 2018. In 14 appearances, with 13 being as a starter for Gwinnett prior to his callup, he had compiled a 3–1 record and a 2.83 ERA. Parsons returned to the International League without making a major league appearance. He was recalled back to the Braves on August 1 for his second call up in the 2018 season. He was then optioned back to Gwinnett the following day. Parsons received another promotion on August 7, and made his major league debut two days later against the Washington Nationals. Parsons made the Braves' Opening Day roster at the start of the 2019 season.  He appeared in relief of Sean Newcomb on April 1, 2019, pitching one inning against the Chicago Cubs to earn his first major league victory. On August 16, 2019, Parsons was designated for assignment.

Colorado Rockies
On August 19, 2019, Parsons was claimed off waivers by the Colorado Rockies. Parsons was designated for assignment on November 27, 2019. He was granted free agency on December 2, 2019, but later re-signed to a minor league deal in the offseason. He became a free agent on November 2, 2020.

NC Dinos 
On January 11, 2021, Parsons signed a deal with the NC Dinos of the KBO League for $320K a year with a $80K signing bonus and a potential $200K coming from incentives. On April 14, 2021, Parsons made his KBO debut, striking out six and earning the win in a start against the SSG Landers. He finished the season with a 4–8 record, 3.72 ERA, and 148 strikeouts over 133.0 innings pitched. On December 21, 2021, he re-signed with the Dinos on a one-year deal worth up to $650,000. He was released on August 4, 2022.

References

External links

1992 births
Living people
People from Clarksville, Tennessee
Baseball players from Tennessee
Major League Baseball pitchers
American expatriate baseball players in South Korea
Atlanta Braves players
Colorado Rockies players
Jackson State Generals baseball players
Rome Braves players
Lynchburg Hillcats players
Mississippi Braves players
Carolina Mudcats players
Gulf Coast Braves players
Gwinnett Braves players
Gwinnett Stripers players
Estrellas Orientales players
American expatriate baseball players in the Dominican Republic
NC Dinos players